The 38th World Artistic Gymnastics Championships were held at the Rod Laver Arena in Melbourne, Australia from 21 to 27 November 2005. Only the individual all-around and event finals were contested at this meet. There was no team competition; nations were permitted to bring up to six Men's Artistic Gymnastics (MAG) and up to four Women's Artistic Gymnastics (WAG) athletes to compete.

Results

Men

Qualification

All-Around Final

Floor Exercise

Pommel Horse

Rings

Vault

Parallel Bars

Horizontal Bar

Women

Qualification

All-Around Final

Vault

Uneven Bars

Balance Beam

Floor Exercise

Medal count

Overall

Men

Women

External links
Official website

 
World Artistic Gymnastics Championships
W
World Artistic Gymnastics Championships
Sports competitions in Melbourne
International gymnastics competitions hosted by Australia